Kalinovka, Azerbaijan may refer to:
Kalinovka, Hajigabul
Kalinovka, Masally